Warren Branch is a stream in Newton County, Missouri and Ottawa County, Oklahoma. It is a tributary of the Spring River.

The stream headwaters arise at  just east of Missouri Route 43 approximately seven miles north-northeast of Seneca. The stream flows generally west for approximately three miles and enters Ottawa County, Oklahoma.

Warren Branch (also called "Warren Creek") has the name of the local Warren family.

See also
List of rivers of Missouri
List of rivers of Oklahoma

References

Rivers of Newton County, Missouri
Rivers of Ottawa County, Oklahoma
Rivers of Missouri
Rivers of Oklahoma